The 99p Challenge is a spoof panel game originally broadcast on BBC Radio 4.  The show is presented by Sue Perkins and features a selection of regular panelists such as Armando Iannucci and regular writers Kevin Cecil, Andy Riley, Jon Holmes and Tony Roche.  Panelists are given silly tasks by Perkins (in a manner not dissimilar to those given on I'm Sorry I Haven't A Clue by Humphrey Lyttelton) and are awarded pence for being funny. The player with the most money at the end of the show is given the chance to win 99p. It has been shown in some episodes that the gamble is compulsory, even if the winner has amassed a fortune of more than 99p in the game.

This is the second version of the panel game that was previously transmitted by BBC Radio 4 in 1998 as King Stupid.  It was then hosted by William Vandyck and featured much the same line-up of comedians and satirists.  The contestants were awarded points instead of pence.

Transmission dates and cast list

Series of the show continue to be repeated on BBC Radio 4 Extra.

Theme Tune 
The show's theme is an excerpt from Alexander Borodin's opera Prince Igor. The show ends with Nena's "99 Luftballons". After the panellists are introduced, a brief snippet of Carl Orff's O Fortuna from Carmina Burana is played.

External links

BBC Radio comedy programmes
BBC Radio 4 programmes
British radio game shows
Parody radio series
1990s British game shows
2000s British game shows
1998 radio programme debuts
2004 radio programme endings